Colada Morada is a drink that is part of Ecuador's gastronomic culture along with t'anta wawa. It is a purple and thick liquid that is prepared with typical fruits of Ecuador, spices and corn flour.

This drink is traditionally consumed on November 2, souls' day or "days of the dead", along with the so-called t'anta wawa (bread usually of non-ordinary flavor and various fillings that has the shape of a doll, hence the name ) which are representations of the dead wrapped in a blanket.

The origin of this drink dates back to pre-Columbian times, where the ancestral peoples related to harvest and planting as synonyms of life and death. Indigenous people from the Ecuadorian mountain range celebrated the rainy season and in turn worshipped their relatives who had died. Being the Colada Morada as a symbol of a happy journey from life to death. For the same reason, they exhumed their dead and shared with them this traditional drink. As a great example in which they celebrated with the colada morada based on the blood of the llamas is the Quitu-Cara culture.

After being colonized by the Spaniards, the tradition was adopted by them and they transformed it into a religious offering, also with their arrival, they brought products like wheat, with this product as a base, they created the t'anta wawa that we now know, and they supplanted the zapallo tortillas cooked in the pot, which was what the Indians commonly ate in this celebration.

Although the tradition is to eat it on the day of the dead, its consumption is usually marketed in the month of October and November.

Ingredients 
Colada Morada is mainly prepared with purple corn flour, which gives it its thick consistency and accentuates the color of the name to that drink. Some people, instead of corn flour, use corn starch, fruits such as naranjilla, pineapple, strawberry, babaco, guava, blackberry or mortiño (wild blueberry from the Andean paramo). It also carries a number of aromatic herbs and barks, such as cinnamon, cloves, ishpingo, sweet pepper, orange leaf, lemongrass, lemon verbena, etc. And to sweeten sugar or panela is used.

See also
 Chicha morada
 List of Ecuadorian dishes and foods
 List of maize dishes

References

External links
Ecuadorian Colada Morada
Non-traditional recipe without corn flour
More traditional recipe using corn flour, in Spanish

Ecuadorian cuisine
Maize-based drinks